Kond (meaning long hill in Armenian; during the Persian rule, Tepebashi) is one of the oldest quarters of Yerevan. It is situated within the boundaries of the modern-day Kentron District of the capital of Armenia.  According to Hovhannes Shahkhatunyants, an Armenian historian, Kond is located at the western and southern hillsides and foot of a rocky hill with similar name. Its western border has historically been the Hrazdan River, and its northern border, the Kozern Cemetery.

Etymology 
Kond, meaning "long hill" in Armenian, so named because of its higher elevation in relation to the surrounding areas. The quarter was also known as Tepebashi (Turkic: tepe - hill, baş - head, top; "top of the hill") while Yerevan was under Persian rule.

History 

Kond was one of Yerevan's three original quarters (mahlas) since the 17th century: Shahar (The Old City), Demir-Bulagh (Karahank), and Kond (Tepebash). Kond, similar to Shahar, was also populated by indigenous Armenians and during Persian rule; they became the majority ethnic group living in the quarter. During this time, the area was presided over by the Geghamian family of meliks. The population of Kond soon became multiethnic, when approximately one hundred Armenian Boshas (Roma) moved to the hill.

Because of the influence of its prior residents, several structures may still be seen that were once Ottoman/Persian/Muslim houses, a mosque, and other buildings that still exhibit such architectural characteristics. The Tepebaşı or Thapha Bashi Mosque was likely built in 1687 during the Safavid dynasty. Today, only the 1.5 meter-thick walls and sections of its outer perimeter roof still stand.  The main dome collapsed in the 1960s (1980's according to residents and neighbors), though a smaller dome still stands. Surp Hovhannes Church (Saint John the Baptist Church) was built in the 15th century at the northern end of Kond. After being damaged by a large earthquake in 1679, it was rebuilt in 1710 by Melik Aghamalyan to serve as his family's private chapel.  Writer and historian Edvard Avagyan notes that, "Kond is our history. In the 17th century many of those who founded Old Yerevan lived here. The famous Aghamalyan dynasty lived in Kond." In 1837, Czar Nikolai I of Russia visited the house of the Balackachov family in Kond. After the Armenian genocide of 1915, many refugees fleeing their homeland came to make Kond their new home.  The mosque served as a place of refuge for seventeen of the families, some of whose descendants (five families) still live there to this day.

Many of Kond's narrow winding streets and alleyways are only three to four feet wide with irrigation ditches to either side. Walls of houses were originally constructed of clay and small stones, which were often built on top of one another without utilities. Today, older homes are being replaced by modern ones, leaving one of Yerevan's only relatively intact older neighborhoods in jeopardy. During the Soviet Era, 500 residents were given new homes in multistory apartment buildings in exchange for their property to build structures like the Dvin Hotel. Plans to fully reconstruct the quarter in 1984-85 were stalled and never materialized.

Since the recent passage of Decision 1151-N, on "Construction programs within the borders of Yerevan's Kentron District" by the Armenian Government on August 1, 2002, there has been a renewed air of uncertainty to whether the local government intends to appropriate Kond and remove existing older structures and its residents (Kondetsis). Residents fear that they will not be compensated, as many of them lack titles to their property. Architect Arshavir Aghekyan indicated that, "The plan wasn't a complete reconstruction, but a reconstruction that would integrate the old and new environments. The plan involved the construction of residential and commercial buildings."

Gallery

See also 
 Districts of Yerevan
 History of Yerevan
 Kumayri (old quarter of Gyumri)

References

External links 

 Pictures of Kond - Old Yerevan
 YouTube: "Kond, the forgotten part of Yerevan" 
 

Populated places in Armenia
Kentron district